Janani Jakaliya Luwum (c. 1922 – 17 February 1977) was the archbishop of the Church of Uganda from 1974 to 1977 and one of the most influential leaders of the modern church in Africa. He was arrested in February 1977 and died shortly after. Although the official account describes a car crash, it is generally accepted that he was murdered on the orders of then-President Idi Amin.

Since 2015 Uganda has a public holiday on 16 February, to celebrate the life of Janani Luwum.

Early life 
Luwum was born in the village of Mucwini in the Kitgum District to Acholi parents. He attended Gulu High School and Boroboro Teacher Training College, after which he taught at a primary school. Luwum converted to Christianity in 1948, and in 1949 he went to Buwalasi Theological College.

Career
In 1950 he was attached to St. Philip's Church in Gulu. He was ordained a deacon in 1953, and the following year he was ordained a priest. He served in the Upper Nile Diocese of Uganda and later in the Diocese of Mbale. In 1969 he was consecrated Bishop of the Diocese of Northern Uganda at Gulu. After five years he was appointed Archbishop of the Metropolitan Province of Uganda, Rwanda, Burundi, and Boga (in Zaire), becoming the second African to hold this position.

Arrest and death

Archbishop Luwum was a leading voice in criticising the excesses of the Idi Amin regime that assumed power in 1971. In 1977, Archbishop Luwum delivered a note of protest to dictator Idi Amin against the policies of arbitrary killings and unexplained disappearances. Shortly afterwards the archbishop and other leading churchmen were accused of treason.

On 16 February 1977, Luwum was arrested together with two cabinet ministers, Erinayo Wilson Oryema and Charles Oboth Ofumbi. The same day Idi Amin convened a rally in Kampala with the three accused present. A few other "suspects" were paraded forth to read out "confessions" implicating the three men. The archbishop was accused of being an agent of the exiled former president Milton Obote, and for planning to stage a coup. The next day, Radio Uganda announced that the three had been killed when the car transporting them to an interrogation centre had collided with another vehicle. The accident, Radio Uganda reported, had occurred when the victims had tried to overpower the driver in an attempt to escape. When Luwum's body was released to his relatives, it was riddled with bullets. Henry Kyemba, minister of health in Amin's government, later wrote in his book A State of Blood, that "The bodies were bullet-riddled. The archbishop had been shot through the mouth and at least three bullets in the chest. The ministers had been shot in a similar way but one only in the chest and not through the mouth. Oryema had a bullet wound through the leg."

According to the later testimony of witnesses, the victims had been taken to an army barracks, where they were bullied, beaten and finally shot. Time magazine said "Some reports even had it that Amin himself had pulled the trigger, but Amin angrily denied the charge, and there were no first-hand witnesses". According to Vice President of Uganda Mustafa Adrisi and a Human rights commission, Amin's right-hand man Isaac Maliyamungu carried out the murder of Luwum and his colleagues.

Legacy
Janani Luwum was survived by his widow, Mary Lawinyo Luwum and nine children. He was buried at his home village of Mucwini in the Kitgum District.

Archbishop Luwum is recognized as a martyr by the Anglican Communion and his statue is among the Twentieth Century Martyrs on the front of Westminster Abbey in London.

He is honored on the liturgical calendars of the Anglican Church of Australia, Anglican Church of Canada, Scottish Episcopal Church, and Church in Wales on 3 June.

He is honored on the liturgical calendars of the Anglican Church in Aotearoa, New Zealand and Polynesia, Episcopal Anglican Church of Brazil, Church of England and the Episcopal Church of the United States on 17 February.

See also

 Bishop of Uganda
 Namirembe

References

External links
The Greatest Ugandan Ever! Part 2
Janani Luwum – biographical sketch from collection: Biographical sketches of memorable Christians of the past, by James Kiefer
"Not even an archbishop was spared", The Weekly Observer, 16 February 2006 (N.B. Link destination requires video software installation)
The Archbishop Janani Luwum Trust UK
 list of past Archbishops of the Church of Uganda

1922 births
1977 deaths
20th-century Anglican archbishops
20th-century Protestant martyrs
Acholi people
Anglican saints
Anglican archbishops of Uganda
Deaths by firearm in Uganda
Extrajudicial killings
Gulu District
Male murder victims
People from Kitgum District
People murdered in Uganda
Ugandan murder victims
Bulwalasi Theological College alumni
Anglican bishops of Northern Uganda